Gordon Emerson Romkey (May 13, 1885 – September 3, 1977) was a general merchant and political figure in Nova Scotia, Canada. He represented Lunenburg in the Nova Scotia House of Assembly from 1928 to 1953 as a Liberal member.

Early life
He was born in West Dublin, Nova Scotia, the son of Michael J. Romkey and Margaret S. Ritchie.

Career
Romkey served on the municipal council and was warden from 1922 to 1928. He was named speaker for the provincial assembly in 1940, serving until his defeat when he ran for reelection in 1953.

Death
He died in 1977.

Personal life
In 1907, he married Elsie A. Slater.

References 
 Canadian Parliamentary Guide, 1941, AL Normandin

1885 births
1977 deaths
Nova Scotia Liberal Party MLAs
Nova Scotia municipal councillors
Speakers of the Nova Scotia House of Assembly